The 2005 Grand Prix de Denain was the 47th edition of the Grand Prix de Denain cycle race and was held on 14 April 2005. The race was won by Jimmy Casper.

General classification

References

2005
2005 in road cycling
2005 in French sport
April 2005 sports events in France